The Shindig is a Mickey Mouse short animated film first released on July 11, 1930, as part of the Mickey Mouse film series. It was the twentieth Mickey Mouse short to be produced, the fifth of that year.

The cartoon's cast includes Mickey Mouse, Minnie Mouse, Clarabelle Cow, Horace Horsecollar and Patricia Pigg.

Plot
Mickey and Minnie are in the back of a long car packed with animals, singing "A-Hunting We Will Go" as they travel to the big Barn Dance. Horace picks up Clarabelle in his rickety motorcycle, and she rides in the wheelbarrow used as a sidecar.

At the dance, Mickey and Minnie play "Turkey in the Straw" on piano and violin for an appreciative crowd of farm animals. The audience applauds, and the mice play "Pop Goes the Weasel". Mickey imaginatively uses a pail, a washtub and even Minnie's tail to play the song, but she does not appreciate his creativity and slaps his hand away. He then plays "Old Folks at Home" on harmonica, and tap dances. Minnie continues the song on piano, and Clarabelle does an energetic solo dance. Mickey dances with Clarabelle, a dachsund, and Patricia Pigg. At the end of the number, Patricia jumps and lands on Mickey, accidentally squashing him flat.

Production
Early in the short, Clarabelle is seen reading the 1907 erotic romance novel Three Weeks. When Horace pulls her tail to indicate that he has come to visit, she hides it under her bed of straw, and puts on a dress to cover her udders. Three Weeks was so controversial that The Shindig was banned in Ohio.

This is the first time that Clarabelle is seen wearing the costume that would become her characteristic outfit. Horace, now completely anthropomorphized, is also seen for the first time in his characteristic outfit of a bowler hat and yoke around his neck; he is no longer ridden like a horse, and instead drives a motorcycle to take Clarabelle to the dance.

Mickey's harmonica solo was animated by Wilfred Jackson, who also performs the song on the soundtrack.

The scene with Mickey dancing with Patricia would appear again in the 1932 cartoon The Whoopee Party.

Voice cast
 Mickey Mouse: Walt Disney
 Minnie Mouse: Marcellite Garner
 Clarabelle Cow: Marcellite Garner
 Horace Horsecollar: Walt Disney

Reception
The Film Daily (September 14, 1930): "Okay. A barnyard setting supplies the locale for this Mickey Mouse performance, which consists of the animals conducting a hoofing spree, with Minnie Mouse doing honors at the piano. Right up to the usual standard of the Mickey Mouse cartoon series."

Variety (January 7, 1931): "Average cartoon comedy revealing no unusual features. It's a barn involving all the animals in the yard. Customary antics and flippancies for smiles rather than laughs. Always okay for the youngsters."

Home media
The short was released on December 7, 2004 on Walt Disney Treasures: Mickey Mouse in Black and White, Volume Two: 1929-1935.

Television
The short was shown on The Mickey Mouse Club (Season 1, Episode 54).

See also
Mickey Mouse (film series)

References

External links
 
 

Mickey Mouse short films
1930s Disney animated short films
1930 short films
1930s dance films
American black-and-white films
1930 animated films
1930 films
Films produced by Walt Disney
American comedy films
Films directed by Burt Gillett
Columbia Pictures short films
Columbia Pictures animated short films
1930s English-language films
1930s American films